Irene Abendroth, born as Irene Thaller von Draga (14 July 1872 – 1 September 1932) was an Austrian-Polish coloratura soprano singer. She was a pupil of Frau Wilczek. She was a member of the Vienna court opera in 1889, and she sang in Riga and Munich, and again in Vienna (1894-99). She was engaged from 1899 to 1908 at the Royal Opera in Dresden.

Her debut in March 1889 at "barely seventeen" as La sonnambula in Vienna, was critiqued as "extraordinary brilliancy of execution, in the best Italian manner, in smooth as well in staccato passages ...her voice is very thin" and she was given a distinctly favorable reception by the audience. Following this performance, the Imperial Opera put "the youthful bravura singer" on trial for one year.

Repertoire

Vincenzo Bellini
Norma (Adalgisa) 
Norma (Norma) 
La sonnambula (Amina)
Gaetano Donizetti
Lucia di Lammermoor (Lucia)
Friedrich von Flotow
Martha (Martha)
Christoph Willibald Gluck
Alceste (Alceste)
Karl Goldmark
Das Heimchen am Herd (Dot)
Ruggiero Leoncavallo
I Pagliacci (Nedda)
Albert Lortzing
Der Wildschütz (Baronin Freimann)
Giacomo Meyerbeer
Robert le diable (Isabella)
Les Huguenots (Marguerite de Valois)
L'Africaine (Selika)
Wolfgang Amadeus Mozart
Le nozze di Figaro (Susanna)
Le nozze di Figaro (Gräfin)
Don Giovanni (Donna Anna)
Don Giovanni (Donna Elvira)
Die Entführung aus dem Serail (Konstanze)
Die Zauberflöte (Königin der Nacht)
Otto Nicolai
Die lustigen Weiber von Windsor (Frau Fluth)
Giacomo Puccini
Tosca (Tosca)
Gioachino Rossini
The Barber of Seville (Rosina)
Ambroise Thomas
Mignon (Mignon)
Giuseppe Verdi
 Falstaff (Alice Ford)
Un ballo in maschera (Amelia)
Otello (Desdemona)
Rigoletto (Gilda)
La traviata (Traviata)
Il trovatore (Leonora)
Carl Maria von Weber
Oberon (Rezia)

References

External links
 Irene Abendroth Recording from the Archive of the Austrian Mediathek: („Frag ich mein beklommnes Herz“ from The Barber of Seville)

1872 births
1932 deaths
Musicians from Lviv
People from the Kingdom of Galicia and Lodomeria
Austrian operatic sopranos
Polish operatic sopranos